Pedro Martínez Sánchez (born 29 June 1961 in Barcelona) is a Spanish professional basketball coach for Baxi Manresa of the Liga ACB.

Coaching career
Martínez has coached Gran Canaria, Cajasol, Girona, Manresa, and Joventut. He was appointed to the Sevilla head coach position in November 2008.

He was voted the Spanish Basketball Coaches Association AEEB Spanish Coach of the Year in 1994. He was also named the European-wide 2nd-tier level EuroCup's Coach of the Year in 2017. Also in that year, Martínez managed Valencia Basket to win their first Liga ACB. However, he did not continue in the team.

On October 27, 2017, Martínez signed as Baskonia head coach, replacing Pablo Prigioni, twelve years after his previous experience in the Basque club. Baskonia made the 2017–18 EuroLeague playoffs, despite an initial 0-4 record when he joined the club. On November 16, 2018, Martínez parted ways with Baskonia after an opening 2-5 record in the EuroLeague, including the 99-84 road defeat at Budućnost VOLI.

In March 2019, Martínez returned to Gran Canaria, which was struggling in the EuroLeague and became the club's third coach of the season.

On June 24, 2019, Baxi Manresa announced the return of Martinez as head coach for the following season.

Coaching record

EuroLeague

|-
| align="left" rowspan=3|Baskonia
| align="left" |2005–06
|4||3||1|||| align="center"|Sacked
|-
| align="left" |2017–18
|30||17||13|||| align="center"|Eliminated in the quarterfinals
|-
| align="left" |2018–19
|7||2||5|||| align="center"|Sacked
|-class="sortbottom"
| align="center" colspan=2|Career||41||22||19||||

Awards and honors
Joventut Badalona
FIBA Korać Cup: (1)
1990
Tenerife
Prince of Asturias Cup: Runner-up
2002
Baskonia
Spanish Supercup: (1)
2005
Valencia
Liga ACB: (1)
2017

References

External links 
 ACB.com Profile 
 Euroleague.net Profile

1961 births
Living people
Bàsquet Manresa coaches
CB Estudiantes coaches
CB Gran Canaria coaches
Liga ACB head coaches
Joventut Badalona coaches
Saski Baskonia coaches
Spanish basketball coaches
Valencia Basket coaches